Orthochromis torrenticola is a species of cichlid endemic to the Democratic Republic of the Congo, where it is known from the Lufira drainage in the upper Congo River basin. This species can reach a length of  SL.

References

External links 

torrenticola
Fish described in 1963
Fish of the Democratic Republic of the Congo
Cichlid fish of Africa
Endemic fauna of the Democratic Republic of the Congo